The 2015 Kilkenny Intermediate Hurling Championship was the 51st staging of the Kilkenny Intermediate Hurling Championship since its establishment by the Kilkenny County Board in 1929. The Championship began on 19 September 2015 and ended on 24 October 2015.

Bennettsbridge won their first intermediate title, beating St. Patrick's 1–16 to 1–14 in a replay.

Emeralds were relegated from the championship following 0–19 to 0–15 defeat to Dunnamaggin.

Results

First round

Relegation play-off

Quarter-finals

Semi-finals

Final

References
http://www.kilkennygaa.ie/fixtures?compGroupID=24469&showArchive=Y&season=2015&orderTBCLast=Y

Kilkenny Intermediate Hurling Championship
Kilkenny Intermediate Hurling Championship